Parco Dragoni is a green area in the frazione Ronco of Forlì, Emilia-Romagna, northern Italy. 

The park is equipped with a small arena for outdoor performances, bicycle and keep-fit paths, a roller rink, a skatepark with several ramps, a children playing area, volley and basket courts and a soccer pitch.

At the entrance stands the local music hall that bands can rent to rehearse and record their music.

External links
 Link to the fourth district of the municipality of Forlì

Green areas and parks in Forlì
Sport in Forlì